Marta García López (born 9 August 2000) is a Spanish professional racing driver.

She is not related to the Spanish racing driver Belén García.

Career
Marta García started her motorsports career in kart racing, where she won titles including the CIK-FIA Karting Academy Trophy in 2015 and the Trofeo delle Industrie of 2015, the oldest kart race in the world, which has previously been won by many Formula 1 champions, such as Fernando Alonso, Lewis Hamilton and Sebastian Vettel.

W Series
In 2019, she took part in the inaugural W Series, finishing 4th in the championship. She started from pole position and won the race at the Norisring event.

Marta was set to contest the 2020 championship before it was cancelled in response to the COVID-19 pandemic. A 10-event eSports series was held on iRacing in its place, with Garcia taking second place in the championship.

García participated in the 2021 W Series season, driving for the newly formed Puma W Series Team. She initially qualified in 7th place for the opening round of the season at the Red Bull Ring, but retired on lap 12 with when her car developed mechanical problems. Four non-points finishes and only a single podium followed, which left García 12th in the standings at the end of the season.

She returned for the 2022 W Series, racing for the CortDAO W Series Team.

Racing record

Career summary

† As García was a guest driver, she was ineligible for points.

Complete F4 Spanish Championship results 
(key) (Races in bold indicate pole position) (Races in italics indicate fastest lap)

† As García was a guest driver, she was ineligible for points.

Complete W Series results
(key) (Races in bold indicate pole position) (Races in italics indicate fastest lap)

References

External links

 
 
 

2000 births
Living people
Spanish female racing drivers
Spanish racing drivers
Spanish F4 Championship drivers
W Series drivers
MP Motorsport drivers
SMP F4 Championship drivers
Drivex drivers
Karting World Championship drivers